Zhang Deshun (born 21 February 1996) is a Chinese long-distance runner. She qualified to represent China at the 2020 Summer Olympics in Tokyo 2021, competing in women's marathon.

References

External links
 

 

1996 births
Living people
Chinese female long-distance runners
Athletes (track and field) at the 2020 Summer Olympics
Olympic athletes of China
Chinese female marathon runners
Universiade gold medalists for China
Universiade medalists in athletics (track and field)
Medalists at the 2019 Summer Universiade
Asian Games bronze medalists for China
Asian Games medalists in athletics (track and field)
Athletes (track and field) at the 2018 Asian Games
Medalists at the 2018 Asian Games
20th-century Chinese women
21st-century Chinese women